The Rouge River (in French: Rivière Rouge) is a tributary of the Noire River (Yamaska River tributary). It flows in the municipalities of Bonsecours and Lawrenceville, in the Le Val-Saint-François Regional County Municipality (MRC), on the South Shore of the Saint Lawrence River, in the administrative region of Estrie, in Quebec, Canada.

Geography 

The main neighboring hydrographic slopes of the Red River are:
 north side: Noire River (Yamaska River tributary), brook Brenda;
 east side: Bowker lake, rivière aux Herbages;
 south side: Noire River (Yamaska River tributary);
 west side: Noire River (Yamaska River tributary).

The Red River begins at the confluence of two mountain streams located northwest of the village of Bonsecours, west of Bowker lake, southwest of Mont Florence-Louise-Bradford and north of route 220.

The course of the Red River descends on:
  southwest to a stream (coming from the village of Bonsecours);
  north-west to the route 243 bridge which passes through the village of Lawrenceville
  towards the north-west, to its mouth.

Toponymy 

The toponym "Rivière Rouge" was officially registered on March 19, 1979, at the Commission de toponymie du Québec.

See also 

 List of rivers of Quebec

References 

Rivers of Montérégie
Le Val-Saint-François Regional County Municipality